The Delacorte Clock, or George Delacorte Musical Clock, is a clock and art installation outside the Central Park Zoo in Central Park, Manhattan, New York. The clock is named after George T. Delacorte Jr., and was dedicated in 1965.

The clock is mounted on a three-tiered tower above the arcade between the Wildlife Center and the Children's Zoo. The clock contains representations of animals playing instruments, and plays music every half hour, at 0 and 30 minutes past the hour, between 8 a.m. and 6 p.m. The clock's music is selected from one of 44 pre-recorded tracks.

In popular culture
The clock appears in:
Marathon Man, 1976 film
Delirious, 1991 film
Madagascar, 2005 animated film
A Rainy Day in New York, 2018 film

References

External links

 

1965 establishments in New York City
1965 sculptures
Animal sculptures in New York City
Clocks in the United States
Outdoor sculptures in Manhattan
Sculptures in Central Park
Statues in New York City